Antonio Escuriet (7 May 1909 – 18 February 1998) was a Spanish road cyclist. Professional from 1930 to 1942, he notably won the 1933 Vuelta a Levante and two stages of the Vuelta a España.

Major results

1930
 5th Overall Vuelta a Levante
1931
 2nd Road race, National Road Championships
 9th Overall Volta a Catalunya
1932
 3rd Overall Vuelta a Levante
1933
 1st  Overall Vuelta a Levante
1st Stage 2
 1st Overall Barcelona–Madrid
1st Stage 1
 1st Stage 4 Vuelta a Pontevedra
 3rd Trofeo Masferrer
1934
 8th Overall Volta a Catalunya
1st Stage 10
 8th Clásica a los Puertos
1935
 1st Stage 2 Vuelta a España
 1st Vuelta a Alava
 2nd Circuito de Getxo
 3rd GP Pascuas
 3rd Prueba Villafranca de Ordizia
 4th Overall Tour of Galicia
1st Stages 6 & 8
1936
 1st GP Pascuas
 3rd Clásica a los Puertos
 5th Overall Vuelta a España
 8th Overall Volta a Catalunya
1939
 3rd Overall Vuelta a Aragón
 4th Overall Volta a Catalunya
1st Stage 5
1940
 3rd Overall Vuelta a Levante
1941
 6th Overall Vuelta a España
1st Stage 4

References

External links

1909 births
1998 deaths
Spanish male cyclists
Spanish Vuelta a España stage winners
People from Ribera Alta (comarca)
Sportspeople from the Province of Valencia
Cyclists from the Valencian Community